The Kentucky 201 was a NASCAR Camping World Truck Series race held at Kentucky Speedway in Sparta, Kentucky. The race, originally held in June or July, was moved to September in 2010. One year later, the race was moved to October. The race, beginning in 2000, was the only Truck Series event at the track until 2010, when they added another event, the UNOH 225. In 2012, the event's distance was shortened from 225 to 201 miles, marking the first time the race wasn't 225 miles in length. The race was removed for the 2013 season.

Past winners

2004 and 2005: Race extended due to a green–white–checker finish.
2011: Ron Hornaday Jr.'s 50th NCWTS win.

Multiple winner (driver)

Multiple winners (teams)

Manufacturer wins

References

External links
 

Former NASCAR races
NASCAR Truck Series races
 

de:Built Ford Tough 225